Welikada North Grama Niladhari Division is a Grama Niladhari Division of the Sri Jayawardanapura Kotte Divisional Secretariat of Colombo District of Western Province, Sri Lanka. It has Grama Niladhari Division Code 514D.

Japanese School in Colombo, President's College, Sri Jayawardenapura Kotte, Sri Jayawardenepura Kotte, Siege of Kotte (1557–58), Election Commission of Sri Lanka, Institute of Chemistry Ceylon, Western Hospital, Hewavitharana Maha Vidyalaya, Royal Colombo Golf Club and Devi Balika Vidyalaya are located within, nearby or associated with Welikada North.

Welikada North is a surrounded by the Rajagiriya, Koswatta, Nawala West, Obesekarapura, Gothamipura and Welikada West Grama Niladhari Divisions.

Demographics

Ethnicity 

The Welikada North Grama Niladhari Division has a Sinhalese majority (73.2%) and a significant Sri Lankan Tamil population (17.6%). In comparison, the Sri Jayawardanapura Kotte Divisional Secretariat (which contains the Welikada North Grama Niladhari Division) has a Sinhalese majority (84.8%)

Religion 

The Welikada North Grama Niladhari Division has a Buddhist majority (68.9%) and a significant Other Christian population (10.0%). In comparison, the Sri Jayawardanapura Kotte Divisional Secretariat (which contains the Welikada North Grama Niladhari Division) has a Buddhist majority (77.1%)

Gallery

References 

Grama Niladhari Divisions of Kotte Divisional Secretariat